Gianmarco Garofoli (born 6 October 2002) is an Italian cyclist, who currently rides for UCI WorldTeam .

Major results

2019
 1st  Road race, National Junior Road Championships
 1st Giro di Primavera
 1st Trofeo Buffoni
 4th Trofeo Emilio Paganesi
 5th Road race, UCI Junior Road World Championships
 10th Overall Giro della Lunigiana
2020
 2nd Time trial, National Junior Road Championships
2021
 2nd Overall Giro della Valle d'Aosta
1st  Young rider classification
1st Stage 2

References

External links

2002 births
Living people
Italian male cyclists
People from Ancona